Fitch Ratings Inc. is an American credit rating agency and is one of the "Big Three credit rating agencies", the other two being Moody's and Standard & Poor's. It is one of the three nationally recognized statistical rating organizations (NRSRO) designated by the U.S. Securities and Exchange Commission in 1975.551

History 
Fitch Ratings is dual headquartered in New York and London. Hearst owns 100 percent of the company following its acquisition of an additional 20 percent for $2.8 billion on April 12, 2018. Hearst had owned 80 percent of the company after increasing its ownership stake by 30 percent on December 12, 2014, in a transaction valued at $1.965 billion. Hearst's previous equity interest was 50 percent following expansions on an original acquisition in 2006.

Hearst had jointly owned Fitch with FIMALAC SA, which held 20 percent of the company until the 2018 transaction. Fitch Ratings and Fitch Solutions are part of the Fitch Group.

The firm was founded by John Knowles Fitch on December 24, 1914, in New York City as the Fitch Publishing Company. In 1989, the company was acquired by a group including Robert Van Kampen. In 1997, Fitch was acquired by FIMALAC and was merged with London-based IBCA Limited, a FIMALAC subsidiary. In 2000 Fitch acquired both Chicago-based Duff & Phelps Credit Rating Co. (April) and Thomson Financial BankWatch (December).

Fitch Ratings is the third largest NRSRO rating agency, covering a more limited share of the market than S&P and Moody's, though it has grown with acquisitions and frequently positions itself as a "tie-breaker" when the other two agencies have ratings similar, but not equal, in scale.

In September 2011, Fitch Group announced the sale of Algorithmics (risk analytics software) to IBM for $387 million. The deal closed on October 21, 2011.

In June of 2022, Fitch Group acquired GeoQuant, a AI-driven data and technology company.

Investment scale 
Fitch Ratings' long-term credit ratings are assigned on an alphabetic scale from 'AAA' to 'D', first introduced in 1924 and later adopted and licensed by S&P. Like S&P, Fitch also uses intermediate +/− modifiers for each category between AA and CCC (e.g., AA+, AA, AA−, A+, A, A−, BBB+, BBB, BBB−, etc.).

Investment grade
 AAA: the best quality companies, reliable and stable 
 AA: quality companies, a bit higher risk than AAA
 A: economic situation can affect finance
 BBB: medium-class companies, which are satisfactory at the moment

Non-investment grade
 BB: more prone to changes in the economy
 B: financial situation varies noticeably
 CCC: currently vulnerable and dependent on favorable economic conditions to meet its commitments
 CC: highly vulnerable, very speculative bonds
 C: highly vulnerable, perhaps in bankruptcy or in arrears, but still continuing to pay out on obligations
 D: has defaulted on obligations, and Fitch believes that it will generally default on most or all obligations
 NR: not publicly rated

Short-term credit ratings 
Fitch's short-term ratings indicate the potential level of default within a 12-month period. 
 F1+   :    best quality grade, indicating exceptionally strong capacity of obligor to meet its financial commitment
 F1    :    best quality grade, indicating strong capacity of obligor to meet its financial commitment
 F2    :    good quality grade with satisfactory capacity of obligor to meet its financial commitment
 F3    :    fair quality grade with adequate capacity of obligor to meet its financial commitment but near term adverse conditions could impact the obligor's commitments
 B     :    of speculative nature and obligor has minimal capacity to meet its commitment and vulnerability to short term adverse changes in financial and economic conditions
 C     :    possibility of default is high and the financial commitment of the obligor are dependent upon sustained, favorable business and economic conditions
 D     :    the obligor is in default as it has failed on its financial commitments.

Fitch Solutions 
Launched in 2008, Fitch Solutions offers a range of fixed-income products and professional development services for financial professionals. The firm also distributes Fitch Ratings' proprietary credit ratings, research, financial data, and analytical tools.

Criticism

The main credit rating agencies, including Fitch, were accused of misrepresenting the risks associated with mortgage-related securities, which included the CDO market.  There were large losses in the collateralized debt obligation (CDO) market that occurred despite being assigned top ratings by the CRAs.

For instance, losses on $340.7 million worth of collateralized debt obligations (CDO) issued by Credit Suisse Group added up to about $125 million, despite being rated AAA by Fitch.
However, differently from the other agencies, Fitch has been warning the market on the constant proportion debt obligations (CPDO) with an early and pre-crisis report highlighting the dangers of CPDO's.

See also 
 FIMALAC
 Kroll Bond Rating Agency
 List of countries by credit rating
 Moody's Investors Service
 Spread Research
 Standard and Poor's

References

External links
 Fitch Ratings
 Fitch Solutions
 Fitch Learning
 U.S. Credit: Fitch Ratings

Credit rating agencies
Financial services companies established in 1914
Financial services companies of the United States
Companies based in New York City
Financial services companies based in New York City
1914 establishments in New York City